Fusion3 is a Greensboro, North Carolina company which manufactures 3D printers for commercial and education use. Fusion3 3D Printers use fused deposition modeling to create three-dimensional solid or hollow objects from a digital model, which can be designed or produced from a scan.

History
Fusion3 was started by North Carolina State University Alumna Katelyn Padgett who after building several kit 3D printers, developed a proprietary linear motion process to improve upon the existing, open source 3D printer designs. The company began production in 2014 without any external investment. The company received a $25,000 grant from the Innovation Fund of North Carolina in 2014 to invest into patent activities and for marketing purposes.

Hardware products

EDGE
Fusion3 released EDGE, a next-generation 3D printer based on the company's patented 'F-Series' motion control system with a continued focus on fast 3D printing of large or many parts with higher temperature/high strength materials, but adding a focus on making their systems even more robust and durable, as well as a focus on ease of use by newer users. EDGE featured both the company's new ANVIL tube print head system, a new bed leveling system, and precision linear rails maintaining the company's fast speeds, but also improving print quality.

F410
Fusion3 debuted the F410, an update to the F400, in April 2018. The F410 maintained all the capabilities of the F400 with a number of new features including swappable print heads of different sizes (.4, .6, and .8MM), filament detection that pauses the F410 if you run out of material or encounter a print jam during a print, and a new conductive, automatic bed leveling system.

F400
In April 2016, Fusion3 introduced the F400. Available as either a single extruder (F400-S) or what it calls the 'high flow rate' (F400-HFR), the F400 is based the same Core XY framework (F-Series Platform) as its predecessor, the F306. The F400 includes a number of additional features, including an enclosed design, 32-bit controller that enables remote management, and automated bed leveling. The F400 build area can accommodate prints up to 14"x14"x12.6" (1.4 cubic feet).

F306
In 2013, Fusion3 introduced the F306 that came in two variants. Available as either a single extruder or dual extruder, the F306 is based on a Core XY framework with an open design, heated bed and E3Dv6 hotend. The F306 build area can accommodate prints up to 12"x12"x12" (1 cubic foot). The F306 line of printers was discontinued in December 2016.

Software product(s)
Fusion3 originally distributed the Simplify3D Creator software slicer software with its 3D printers. However, in October, 2020, it launched its REACTOR 3D printing software which it bundles as default with all its 3D printers.

Materials
Fusion3 printers can print with the following materials as of March, 2022:

Filament based
 ABS
 PLA including carbon fiber, ceramic and wood infused compounds
 PET & PETG
 Nylon
 Carbon Fiber filled
 Fiberglass filled
 PCTPE
 ASA
 PC-ABS
 Polycarbonate
 Flexible (TPU / TPE)
 Polyesters
 Polypropylene
 PVDF
 Metal (316L SS)
 Acrylic / PMMA
 Soluble (PVA & HIPS)

Specifications

See also
 3D printing or Rapid manufacturing 
 Additive manufacturing
 Desktop manufacturing
 Digital fabricator
 Instant manufacturing, also known as "direct manufacturing" or "on-demand manufacturing"
 List of 3D printer manufacturers

References

External links
 Fusion3 Website

3D printer companies
Companies based in Greensboro, North Carolina
Manufacturing companies based in North Carolina
Manufacturing companies of the United States
Fused filament fabrication
Companies established in 2013